Samuel H. Boardman State Scenic Corridor is a linear state park in southwestern Oregon, in the United States. It is named in honor of Samuel H. Boardman, the first Oregon Parks superintendent.

The north end abuts the Pistol River State Scenic Viewpoint. More than 14 named creeks cross the corridor.

The Oregon Coast Trail meanders for about  through the park, among 300-year-old Sitka spruce trees and several natural arches and bridges. There is beach access and some sand dunes.
The Oregon Islands National Wildlife Refuge and Oregon Islands Wilderness protect wildlife and habitat on all of the approximately 130 rocks and islands along the corridor's shore.

History 
The area was used by Native Americans. Later, it was used by several (now abandoned) mining operations, whose ruins are still visible.

At the Indian Sands site within the park, archaeological finds have provided evidence of human activity in this area 10,000 to 12,000 years ago, which is likely the result of migration along the Pacific coast from the area of the Bering Land Bridge.

The first acquisition for the park was  purchased in May 1949. There were at least 12 additional purchases made by May 1957. The Oregon Parks Commission received its first alien gift of  made in 1950 by Borax Consolidated, Ltd of London, which retains the right to mine underground minerals such as borax. The company acquired the land c. 1880 for mining purposes.

There have never been overnight facilities.

See also 
 List of Oregon State Parks

References

External links 
 

Parks in Curry County, Oregon
State parks of Oregon
1949 establishments in Oregon
Protected areas established in 1949